Old Town is an area of Mombasa, Kenya.

In 1997, the Old Town and Fort Jesus were submitted by the National Museums of Kenya for selection in UNESCO's list of World Heritage Sites.

Geography 
The area is located to the east of Mombasa Island, adjacent to Tudor Creek.

Architecture 
Buildings in the Old Town are mostly Swahili, however,  the many other ones are influenced by Mombasa's trade culture and foreign occupation, with many examples of colonial Portuguese styles from the 16th century and modern Islamic architecture.

Attractions

Fort Jesus 

The Portuguese Fort Jesus is located in the Old Town, and is Mombasa's most popular tourist attraction.

See also

Changamwe
Bamburi
Kipevu

Footnotes

Sources 

 
 
 
 
 

Mombasa
Populated places in Coast Province
Swahili architecture